Joan Bagaria Pigrau (born August 17, 1958) is a Catalan mathematician, logician and set theorist at ICREA and University of Barcelona. He has made many contributions concerning forcing, large cardinals, infinite combinatorics and their applications to other areas of mathematics. He earned his Ph.D. in Logic & the Methodology of Science at Berkeley in 1991 under the supervision of Haim Judah and W. Hugh Woodin. Since 2001, he has been ICREA Research Professor at University of Barcelona. He served as the first president of the European Set Theory Society (2007–11). He is also a talented teacher.

His research work is widely cited, and he has given talks to the general public.

He is also an active Catalan independentist.

Some publications

References

External links
Home page at ICREA
Personal Profile at ResearchGate

University of California, Berkeley alumni
Set theorists
Living people
1958 births